BFY may refer to:

 Bremenfly (ICAO code BFY), a German charter airline
 Bagheli language (ISO 639-3 code bfy), a Hindi language of the Baghelkhand region of central India